Sin (Sinthea Shmidt) is a supervillain appearing in American comic books published by Marvel Comics. The character is the daughter of the Red Skull and an enemy of Captain America.

Publication history
Sin first appeared in Captain America #290 (Feb 1984), and was created by J.M. DeMatteis and Paul Neary.

Fictional character biography

Seeking an heir, the Red Skull (Johann Shmidt) fathered a daughter with a washerwoman. After the woman died in childbirth, the Red Skull angrily almost killed the child due to being a girl. But follower Susan Scarbo convinced him not to, with the latter wanting to raise the girl herself as a nanny. The Red Skull agreed and left the girl, now named "Sinthea Schmidt", with Scarbo to be raised and indoctrinated with Red Skull's views as she grew up. The Red Skull returned when Sinthea was a child and put her in a machine that had her aged into adulthood and gave her superhuman powers.

As Mother Superior, she was the leader of a group called the Sisters of Sin, young orphan girls who were accelerated into adulthood and given psionic powers by the Red Skull after being indoctrinated by Sinthea. The Sisters of Sin would have many run-ins with Captain America (Steve Rogers) before being de-aged when they entered a chamber designed to reverse the Red Skull's aging process and they were restored to children (she would later claim she was deaged to the wrong age - but whether this is true or not is unclear).

Later, Mother Night reformed the Sisters of Sin as their new leader, while the de-aged Sinthea herself has used the name Sister Sin.

Sometime later, she was captured by S.H.I.E.L.D. and taken to their reeducation facility, where they reprogrammed her with false memories as the "normal" American girl Erica Holstein. After the Red Skull was seemingly assassinated by the Winter Soldier under Aleksander Lukin's orders, Crossbones broke into the facility, kidnapped her and tortured her to break the reprogramming. After he succeeded, she simply called herself "Sin" while she entered into a relationship with Crossbones and the two went on a killing spree. She later reunited with the Red Skull who was now inside Lukin's body.

As the first part of the Red Skull's master plan, Sin disguised herself as a nurse after the Civil War while Crossbones sniped Captain America at the courthouse, even though it meant obeying her father and abandoning Crossbones to his fate. Sin then revealed to Sharon Carter that Carter was the one who had killed Captain America. Now the leader of a new incarnation of the Serpent Squad, Sin breaks Crossbones out of jail. He is later apprehended again and Sin wounded in an attempt to break into the Capitol Building. Sin is later sent to assassinate the Democratic and Republican presidential candidates, but is stopped by Captain America (Bucky Barnes). In Captain America: Reborn, Sin attempts to assist Norman Osborn to put her father in Steve Rogers's body; however, she is injured by her father's mechanical body's explosion and her face is hideously scarred.

She is later visited in prison by Baron Helmut Zemo for information on Bucky Barnes. Sometime later, Master Man springs her from prison, prompting her to take her place as the new "Red Skull". She delivers a video to the media recorded three months before Barnes's trial, declaring that the reformed hero was not brainwashed, but was an accomplice and fully aware of these actions. She, along with Master Man, is later seen on Ellis Island where she pretends to blow up the Statue of Liberty with Falcon and Black Widow bound and gagged inside, unless Barnes is delivered to her.

During the Fear Itself storyline, Sin, with Baron Zemo's help, unearths the Hammer of Skadi and becomes Skadi in order to free the Serpent: God of Fear from his underwater prison. Sin vows to do what her father failed to do in taking over the world. She succeeds in her mission in freeing the Serpent and then prepares an army of Nazis to take over the D.C. Capital. During their battle in Washington, D.C., Skadi mortally wounds the current Captain America. In the final battle, Skadi battles Rogers. Thor gives Rogers the hammer Mjolnir to make up for the loss of the shield. Thor manages to kill the Serpent and Odin strips the Worthy of their hammers, causing Sin to lose Skadi's powers. This leaves Sin incapacitated.

Sin later returns as one of the villains working alongside Zemo as part of a plot to forcibly sterilize the human race. She battles Captain America (Sam Wilson) and apparently falls to her death after refusing to allow the hero to save her from an explosion.

After meeting the mysterious Kobik who was created from a shard of the Cosmic Cube, Sin's face was restored to normal. At the end of the Avengers: Standoff! storyline, Sin was with the Red Skull's clone when the latter re-establishes HYDRA with Crossbones.

When Jane Foster is forced to step down from her role on the Congress of the Nine Realms by Cul Borrson, the twisted god attempts to nominate Sin as Midgard's new representative, but Foster has already appointed S.H.I.E.L.D. agent Roz Solomon as her replacement.

During the Secret Empire storyline, Sin and Crossbones are shown to be in charge of a super-prison that was established by HYDRA. Their super-prison was raided by the Underground in their mission to free their captive friends.

Learning of an alternate future where her father took over the world, Sin allies with Miss Sinister and Mysterio, along with the forces of 'Neo-Hydra', with the goal of repeating the feat that led to that victory, in the form of Mysterio manipulating someone- Old Man Logan in the original version of events- into attacking other heroes. However, when Mysterio learns that the other villains plan to kill him once their efforts have succeeded, he turns on the other villains and betrays their location to a group of Avengers, which forces Neo-Hydra to flee.

Powers and abilities
Sin appears to have no superhuman abilities but being trained by her father, the Red Skull, through which she is an expert hand-to-hand combatant and martial artist. She is also highly proficient in firearms and explosives, and has a high-level intellect.

As Mother Superior, Sin possessed a range of superhuman powers including telepathy, telekinesis, teleportation and intangibility. After she was de-aged, she apparently lost these powers completely - unlike the other "Sisters of Sin", whose powers were diminished but not eliminated upon de-aging. The reason for this discrepancy has never been revealed.

As wielder of the Hammer of Skadi, Sin as "Skadi" could fly or propel herself through water at great speeds. She could also release large amounts of electricity and energy from the hammer and teleport herself to other places. The hammer could also be used as a blunt-force melee weapon or as a throwing projectile. She eventually lost these powers after the Hammer was apprehended.

In other media

Film
A daughter of the Red Skull appears in Captain America, portrayed by Francesca Neri. This version is Valentina de Santis, the Italian daughter and underboss of Tadzio de Santis / Red Skull.

Video games
 Sin appears in Marvel Avengers Alliance.
 Sin appears in Captain America: The Winter Soldier - The Official Game.
 Sin appears as a playable character in Marvel: Future Fight.
 Sin appears in Marvel's Midnight Suns via "The Good, The Bad, and the Undead" DLC. This version is the granddaughter of the Red Skull who initially works for Hydra before betraying them to join Dracula.

Miscellaneous
Sin appears as a playable character in the Marvel Crisis Protocol tabletop game. This version is the leader of the Cabal.

References

External links 
 

Captain America
Characters created by J. M. DeMatteis
Characters created by Paul Neary
Comics characters introduced in 1984
Fictional characters who can turn intangible
Fictional characters with disfigurements
Hydra (comics) agents
Marvel Comics characters who can teleport
Marvel Comics female supervillains
Marvel Comics mutates
Marvel Comics characters who have mental powers
Marvel Comics telekinetics
Marvel Comics telepaths